Naservand (also Romanized as Nāşervand and Nāusarwān) is a village in Yusefvand Rural District, in the Central District of Selseleh County, Lorestan Province, Iran. At the 2006 census, its population was 210, in 44 families.

References 

Towns and villages in Selseleh County